Mahisha Dellinger (born 1973) is an entrepreneur, author and TV host. She is the Chief Executive Officer and Founder of CURLS, a natural hair care brand founded in 2002. She is the author of Against All Odds: From the Projects to the Penthouse. Dellinger hosts Mind Your Business with Mahisha on OWN, which debuted in August 2018.

Career
Dellinger founded Curls in 2002. Since then she has worked with other celebrities such as Tameka Cottle in developing their businesses.

Personal life
Dellinger was born in 1973 in the Meadowview neighborhood of Sacramento, California. She has four children.

References

Living people
1973 births
African-American company founders
American company founders
American women company founders
American women chief executives
African-American television personalities
Businesspeople from Sacramento, California
21st-century African-American people
21st-century African-American women
20th-century African-American people
20th-century African-American women